Cerrione is a comune (municipality) in the Province of Biella in the Italian region Piedmont, located about  northeast of Turin and about  south of Biella.

Cerrione borders the following municipalities: Borriana, Magnano, Roppolo, Salussola, Sandigliano, Verrone, Zimone, Zubiena.

Biella-Cerrione Airport is located in Cerrione.

References

Cities and towns in Piedmont